Spectra is a professional association of LGBTQIA+ mathematicians. It arose from a need for recognition and community for Gender and Sexual Minority mathematicians.

History 
Spectra has its roots in meetups arranged at the Joint Mathematics Meetings (JMM) and a mailing list organized by Ron Buckmire. It arose in reaction to the JMM being scheduled to occur in Denver in 1995 when the state of Colorado voters approved the anti-gay 1992 Colorado Amendment 2. The association's name was coined by Robert Bryant and Mike Hill and references the mathematical concept of a spectrum as well as the rainbow flag. Its first official activity was a panel at the 2015 JMM with the title "Out in Mathematics: LGBTQ Mathematicians in the Workplace."

Out and Ally Lists 
Spectra maintains a list of mathematicians who are out in the LGBTQIA+ community as well as a list of allies for the community. The goal of the list is to serve as support for mathematicians at various places on their own LGBTQ+ journeys and also as a resource for people looking to learn more about the climate at various universities. Each mathematician on the list has a profile with, e.g., name, position, location, pronouns, and contact preferences. Any identity words or pronouns listed were given by the person being profiled when they completed an online form to be listed.

Activism and Engagement 
Given that Spectra's origins are steeped in activism, it makes sense that the organization continues to advocate on behalf of LGBTQIA+ mathematicians. For instance, the association is working with scholarly publishers around transgender mathematicians and their names in published works.

Spectra continues to also work toward increased visibility of LGBTQIA+ mathematicians, through conferences, workshops, panel discussions, and designated lectures.

Board 
The Spectra board includes many prominent mathematicians, including Bryant, Buckmire, Moon Duchin, Hill, Doug Lind, and Emily Riehl.

References 

Professional associations based in the United States
Mathematical societies
LGBT organizations in the United States
LGBT mathematicians
Organizations for LGBT science